Shvernik Commission (Shvernik's Commission) was an informal name of the commission of the CPSU Central Committee Presidium headed by Nikolay Shvernik for the investigation of political repression in the Soviet Union during the period of Stalin. Other members were Alexander Shelepin, Zinovy Serdyuk, Roman Rudenko, Olga Shatunovskaya, Nikolai Mironov, and Vladimir Semichastny.

It was the second major commission of the kind. (The first one was the commission headed by Vyacheslav Molotov.) The commission  worked during 1961-1963 and produced about 200 pages of two reports, which detailed the mechanism of falsification of the show trials against Bukharin, Zinoviev, Tukhachevsky and many others. The commission based its findings in large part on eyewitness testimonies of former NKVD workers and victims of repressions, and on many documents. The commission recommended to rehabilitate every accused with exception of Karl Radek and Genrikh Yagoda, because Radek's materials required some further checking, and Yagoda was a criminal and one of the falsifiers of the trials (though most of the charges against him had to be dropped too, he wasn't a "spy", etc.). The commission stated:

Stalin committed a very grave crime against the Communist party, the socialist state, Soviet people and worldwide revolutionary movement... Together with Stalin, the responsibility for the abuse of law, mass unwarranted repressions and death of many thousands of wholly innocent people also lies on Molotov, Kaganovich, Malenkov...

Bodies of the Communist Party of the Soviet Union
Political repression in the Soviet Union
1961 establishments in the Soviet Union
1962 in the Soviet Union
1963 in the Soviet Union
De-Stalinization